Conus coltrorum is a species of sea snail, a marine gastropod mollusk in the family Conidae, the cone snails, cone shells or cones.

These snails are predatory and venomous. They are capable of "stinging" humans.

Description

Distribution
This species of cone snail occurs in the Caribbean Sea.

References

 Puillandre N., Duda T.F., Meyer C., Olivera B.M. & Bouchet P. (2015). One, four or 100 genera? A new classification of the cone snails. Journal of Molluscan Studies. 81: 1-23

External links
 To World Register of Marine Species
 Cone Shells - Knights of the Sea
 

coltrorum
Gastropods described in 2014